Up the Shambles – Live in Manchester is a live DVD of the band Babyshambles. The DVD was released without the band's prior knowledge according to bassist Drew McConnell. The DVD was released around the time of the band's second album Shotters Nation, but not only featured a much older version of the band, it was recorded prior to the release of the first album Down in Albion. The set list features songs of the band's debut, B-sides, unreleased songs and songs by Pete Doherty's other band The Libertines.

Track listing
"The Man Who Came to Stay"
"Do You Know Me?"
"In Love with a Feeling"
"Babyshambles"
"Gang of Gin"
"Fuck Forever"
"I Mean You No Harm"
"Sheepskin Tearaway" / "Free as a Bird" (The Beatles cover)
"Don't Look Back into the Sun"
"Time for Heroes" / "Well I Wonder" (The Smiths cover)
"Albion" / "Music When the Lights Go Out"
"I Wanna Break Your Heart"
"What Katy Did"
"Killamangiro"
"My Darling Clementine"
"Blackboy Lane"
"Wolfman"

Bonus features
Behind the scenes with Babyshambles, including full Pete Doherty solo acoustic performances of "Time For Heroes" and "Can't Stand Me Now", and Babyshambles performing "Babyshambles" plus other live clips.

Personnel
Pete Doherty – vocals, Guitar
Patrick Walden – Guitar
Drew McConnell – Bass guitar
Gemma Clarke – drums

Guest appearance:
Dot Allison – vocals

Babyshambles albums
2007 live albums
2007 video albums
Live video albums